Tritonian Nash-Vegas Polyester Complex is the third studio album by American no wave band No Trend, released in 1986 through Touch and Go Records. The album continues the experimental path the band created with their previous record, A Dozen Dead Roses. The album was ill-received among the American underground, to the point that owners of the record would return it for refunds. Up until the reissue of Too Many Humans in 2020, Tritonian Nash-Vegas Polyester Complex and its follow-up album More were the only No Trend albums to be available through digital outlets such as iTunes due to the belief that the master tapes for all of the band's previous material were lost.

Track listing

Personnel

Performers
Jeff Mentges - Vocals (Credited as Clif "Babe" Ontego)
Nick Smiley - Alto Saxophone
Scott Rafal - Baritone Saxophone
Johnny Ontego - Tenor Saxophone, Horn Arrangements
Paul Henzey - Trumpet
Leif - Guitar
Bobby Birdsong - Guitar
Smokey - Bass
Dean Evangelista - Keyboards
Rogelio Maxwell - Cello
Chris Pestelozzie - Percussion
James "Fuzz" Peachy - Drums

Production
Ken Mora - Engineering, Mixing
No Trend - Music, Mixing

References

External links 
 
 

1986 albums
No Trend albums
Touch and Go Records albums